James Waddell (born c. 1937) is a Scottish curler.

Waddell and the entirety of his 1964 Scottish champion rink were farmers from Hamilton.

Teams

Men's

Mixed

Private life

References

External links
 

Living people
1930s births
Scottish male curlers
European curling champions
Scottish curling champions
Sportspeople from Hamilton, South Lanarkshire
Scottish farmers